Ahmad Beyg (also Romanized as Aḩmad Beyg; also known as Aḩmad Beyk) is a village in Chaharduli Rural District, Keshavarz District, Shahin Dezh County, West Azerbaijan Province, Iran. At the 2006 census, its population was 107, in 20 families.

References 

Populated places in Shahin Dezh County